Air Bangladesh was an airline based in Bangladesh. It was founded in 2000 and dissolved in 2005.

Code data

IATA Code: B9
ICAO Code: BGD
Callsign: AIR BANGLA

Fleet

Air Bangladesh (no relation to Biman Bangladesh Airlines) operated only one older jet aircraft, a Boeing 747-269B(SF) (registration S2-ADT). The aircraft was acquired by Air Bangladesh in August 2004 and was painted in a basic and Kalitta Air color.

Ban in the European Union
Air Bangladesh was banned from entering EU airspace. The reasons for this decision were safety deficiencies, as well as poor transparency of the airline's operations. the Commission assessed that Air Bangladesh should be submitted to a strict operational restriction.

References

External links

Defunct airlines of Bangladesh
Airlines established in 2000
Airlines disestablished in 2005
Bangladeshi companies established in 2000
2005 disestablishments in Bangladesh